Leadership is the practical skill of influencing or guiding others.

Leadership may also refer to:

 Leadership (book), a 2002 political book by Rudolph W. Giuliani
 Leadership: Six Studies in World Strategy, a 2022 political book by Henry Kissinger
 Leadership (journal), an academic journal of management studies
  Leadership (newspaper), a Nigerian daily
 "Leadership" (I Pity the Fool), a television episode
 Leadership High School, in San Francisco, California, US
 Leadership Institute at Harvard College, a Harvard College undergraduate organization

See also
 Leadership Academy (disambiguation)
 Price leadership
 Vanguardism, in Leninist theory